Deqing Moganshan Airport (IATA: DEQ), located in Moganshan High-Tech Industrial Development Zone, Deqing, Huzhou, Zhejiang, China, is the nearest general aviation airport to Hangzhou, and also the largest among general aviation airports in eastern China.

History
In October 2018, the Civil Aviation Administration of China issued "A1 General Aviation Airport License" to the airport. An inaugural flight ceremony was held later that year.

In May 2019 the airport received 3-letter-code "DEQ" from IATA.

Facilities
 One airport terminal and one runway which is 600 meters long (will be upgraded to 1800 meters)
 Apron: 54,000 square-meters (capacity: 25 for fixed-wing aircraft and 19 for helicopters)
 Hangar: 6,700 square-meters

References 

Airports established in 2018
2018 establishments in China
Airports in Zhejiang
Deqing County, Zhejiang